Andrew Richard Good (born September 19, 1979) is a former professional baseball player who was a pitcher for the Arizona Diamondbacks and Detroit Tigers of Major League Baseball. He is a 1998 graduate of Rochester High School where he was taken in the 8th round of the 1998 Major League Baseball Draft.

Good made his major league debut in 2003 for the Diamondbacks, pitching in 16 games, 10 starts. In 2004, he pitched mainly out of the bullpen, appearing in 17 games. He was acquired by Detroit in the offseason of 2005, spending most of the 2005 season in the AAA level. In 2006, he played in the Washington Nationals organization for the Triple-A New Orleans Zephyrs. In 2007, Good pitched in 3 games for the Triple-A Syracuse Chiefs in the Toronto Blue Jays organization, starting one game and relieving in two more. After his baseball career he worked as a 3rd and 5th grade teacher at the elementary school of North Hill in Rochester, MI. He currently works as an 8th grade history teacher at Hart middle school in Rochester Hills, MI.

External links

Living people
1979 births
Major League Baseball pitchers
Baseball players from San Diego
Arizona League Diamondbacks players
South Bend Silver Hawks players
Lancaster JetHawks players
El Paso Diablos players
Tucson Sidewinders players
Toledo Mud Hens players
New Orleans Zephyrs players
Syracuse Chiefs players
Arizona Diamondbacks players
Detroit Tigers players
People from Rochester, Michigan